Burlington Community School District (BCSD) is a public school district headquartered in Burlington, Iowa. Entirely in Des Moines County, it serves Burlington and Middletown, as well as residences in the western portion of West Burlington.

History
School District No. 2 of the Township of Burlington was established on March 29, 1849, when 63% of voters at Congregational Church agreed to create it. The first school built with taxpayer money, with construction in the period 1851–1852, was North Hill School.

Schools
As of July, 2020, the district operates seven schools:

 Burlington Community High School
 Aldo Leopold Intermediate School
 Edward Stone Middle School
 Black Hawk Elementary School
 Grimes Elementary School
 North Hill Elementary School
 Sunnyside Elementary School

Former schools

At one time the district had 15 elementary schools and three middle schools, but the board of education decided to enact a "Newer and Fewer" school consolidation program, in which new school buildings opened with each replacing multiple older schools.

Middle schools:
 James Madison Middle School - Jane Evans, the superintendent as of 2012, stated that the lack of total air conditioning and lower ceilings made it outdated.
 Horace Mann Middle School
 Oak Street Middle School

Elementary schools:
 Central Avenue Elementary School
 Corse Elementary School
 Perkins Elementary School
 Prospect Hill Elementary School
 Salter Elementary School
 Washington Elementary School

Enrollment

See also
List of school districts in Iowa

References

External links
 Burlington Community School District
 
School districts in Iowa
Education in Des Moines County, Iowa
School districts established  in 1849
1849 establishments in Iowa